Brachythops is a genus of insects belonging to the family Tenthredinidae.

The genus was first described by Haliday in 1839.

The species of this genus are found in Europe and Northern America.

Species:
 Brachythops flavens (Klug, 1816)

References

Tenthredinidae
Sawfly genera